There have been two baronetcies created for persons with the surname Matheson, both in the Baronetage of the United Kingdom. One creation is extant as of 2017.

The Matheson Baronetcy, of The Lews in the County of Ross, was created in the Baronetage of the United Kingdom in 1851 for the Scottish businessman and politician James Matheson. He was co-founder of the firm of Jardine Matheson. The title became extinct on his death in 1878.

The Matheson Baronetcy, of Lochalsh in the County of Ross, was created in the Baronetage of the United Kingdom on 15 May 1882 for the businessman and Liberal politician Alexander Matheson. He was the nephew of the first Baronet of the 1850 creation and a partner in Jardine Matheson. Matheson also represented Inverness Burghs and Ross and Cromarty in the House of Commons. The Matheson family owned Gledfield House, a nineteenth-century country house, near Ardgay, Sutherland. It was developed in the 1850s and extended by architects Ross & Macbeth, for the second baronet, Sir Kenneth Matheson, from 1895 to 1907. The third Baronet was a member of the Senate of Australia. The fifth Baronet was a General in the Army. The sixth Baronet succeeded his kinsman as Chief of Clan Matheson in 1975.

Matheson baronets, of The Lews (1850)
Sir James Matheson, 1st Baronet (1796–1878)

Matheson baronets, of Lochalsh (1882)
Sir Alexander Matheson, 1st Baronet (1805–1886)
Sir Kenneth James Matheson, 2nd Baronet (1854–1920)
Sir Alexander Perceval Matheson, 3rd Baronet (1861–1929)
Sir Roderick Mackenzie Chisholm Matheson, 4th Baronet (1861–1944)
Sir Torquhil George Matheson, 5th Baronet (1871–1963)
Sir Torquhil Alexander Matheson, 6th Baronet (1925–1993)
Sir Fergus John Matheson, 7th Baronet (1927–2017)
Lieutenant-Colonel Sir Alexander Fergus Matheson of Matheson, 8th Baronet LVO DL (born 1954)

References
Kidd, Charles, Williamson, David (editors). Debrett's Peerage and Baronetage (1990 edition). New York: St Martin's Press, 1990.

Baronetcies in the Baronetage of the United Kingdom
Clan Matheson
Extinct baronetcies in the Baronetage of the United Kingdom